M. Akram (28 March 1934 – 3 April 2016) was a famous Pakistani film director.

Early life and career
Muhammad Akram was born in Gujranwala, Punjab, Pakistan. However, his family shifted to Lahore, when he was very young. He finished his basic education in Lahore. Veteran Pakistani film director Anwar Kamal Pasha first helped him get a film editor's job in his film Dilbar (1951). M. Akram was first a film editor in the beginning of his professional career from 1951 to 1958. His first film as film director was Ghar Jawai (1958) and then he gained some fame from the Punjabi film Banki Naar in 1966. He was a brother of M. Parvez, who produced most of their common films.

Major films
Listed below are some of his successful films:
 Ghar Jawai (1958) 
 Baanki Naar (1966)
 Charda Suraj (1970)
 Uchha Naan Pyar Da (1971)
 Sultan (1972)
 Khan Chacha (1972) A Diamond Jubilee film
 Sidha Rasta (1974)
 Ishq Mera Naa (1974) A Platinum Jubilee film
 Hathiar (1979)
 Khuddar (1985 film) A Golden Jubilee film
 Sanjhi Hathkadi (1986)

Awards and recognition
 Nigar Award for Best Editing in film Shaam Dhalay (1960)
 Nigar Award for Best Editing in film Gulfam (1961)

Death
He died on 3 April 2016 at Lahore, Pakistan.

See also
List of Pakistani directors

References

External links 
 
Filmography of director M. Akram on IMDb website

1934 births
2016 deaths
Pakistani film editors
Pakistani film directors
Nigar Award winners